Maha Bandula Garden Street (formerly Barr Street) is a street of Yangon, Burma. It runs past Maha Bandula Park.

Streets in Yangon